Virgin Gorda is the third-largest island (after Tortola and Anegada) and second-most populous of the British Virgin Islands (BVI).

Geography

The main commercial and residential area is Spanish Town on the southwestern part of the island.

An unusual geologic formation known as "the Baths" located on the southern end of the island makes Virgin Gorda one of the BVI's major tourist destinations. At the Baths, in spite of evidence of the island's largely volcanic origins, huge granite boulders lie in piles on the beach, forming scenic grottoes that are open to the sea. Granite is an intrusive igneous rock, thus not volcanic.  It did form from magma, however, at great depth.  Granite becomes exposed at the Earth's surface only after geologic ages of erosion removes the overburden.  At the surface, weathering has broken the granite into large boulders and rounded their surfaces.  North of the Baths is the Virgin Gorda Yacht Harbor, formerly owned by Little Dix Bay. The most notable ruin on Virgin Gorda is the old Copper Mine.

One of the great harbors of the world, North Sound, and historically Gorda Sound, lies at the northeast end of the island. At the eastern end of the sound is the premier anchorage, in the lee of Biras Hill (elevation ). The village, resort, and marina at this point (Jon'O'Point) is called the Bitter End Yacht Club, and runs for about a mile of coastline.

History
Christopher Columbus is said to have named the island "the Fat Virgin", because the island's profile on the horizon looks like a fat woman lying on her side.

Historically renowned, the anchorage off Bitter End was the site of Sir Francis Drake and Sir John Hawkins' 1595 fleet rendezvous, two Elizabethan British admirals who led Britain's ascendance into naval supremacy. Twenty-six ships anchored in the sound and used the large hill at Bitter End to practice for their attack on San Juan, to wrest Puerto Rico from Spain. With both admirals dying on the 1595/1596 voyage, the land at Bitter End may be the last place that these legendary mariners set foot on British soil.

Transportation
Marine ferry services from Tortola, St. Thomas, and St. John, as well as small commuter airlines, serve the island. In January 2010, Virgin Gorda Airport was restricted to a very small list of airlines by Air Safety Support International, the territory's aviation regulatory agency, which demanded that the airport be brought in line with international safety standards. The airport reopened in December 2010.

Tourists travel from neighboring islands such as Tortola and St. Thomas by boat and then return to these islands by boat in order to travel on scheduled passenger airlines flights operated into the Tortola Terrance B. Lettsome International Airport and St. Thomas Cyril E. King Airport.

Education
The BVI operates several government schools. Virgin Gorda residents are served by Robinson O'Neal Memorial Primary School and Bregado Flax Educational Centre, a combined primary and secondary school that opened in 1982. In 2000 the government created plans to create a primary school on the island.

Religion
 St. Ursula's Church, The Valley

Trivia

 A map with the outline of Virgin Gorda appears as the map of the Republic of Corte Maltese in the movie The Suicide Squad.

References

External links

 
Islands of the British Virgin Islands
Former English colonies